Mulshi is the name of a major dam on the Mula river in India. It is located in the Mulshi taluka administrative division of the Pune district of Maharashtra State.

Water from the dam is used for irrigation as well as for producing electricity at the Bhira hydroelectric power plant, operated by Tata Power. The station operates six 25MW Pelton turbines established in 1927 and one 150MW Pumped Storage Unit. Water from this reservoir located in Krishna river basin is diverted to the Bhira power house for generating Hydro electricity.

In 1920–21, during the construction of the dam and power station, Pandurang Mahadev Bapat led Mulshi Satyagrah, a movement to represent farmers whose land had been taken to build the project. He was dubbed Senapati (commander) in recognition of his leadership.

Tourism
In recent years Mulshi and adjoining areas have been developed as a tourist destination, adding accommodation for leisure guests. The place is around 2 hours drive from Pune and is a major attraction over the weekends. Best time to visit Mulshi is from August to October.

References

External links

 Tata Hydro Power Plants Tata Power's hydro power projects in India, including photos of Muslhi Dam and Bhira Power Station

Dams in Pune district
Pumped-storage hydroelectric power stations in India
1927 establishments in India
Dams completed in 1927
20th-century architecture in India